Jutro (trans. Morning) was a Yugoslav rock band formed in Ljubljana in 1970. Initially performing boogie rock and later turning towards jazz rock, Jutro was a prominent act of the Yugoslav rock scene in the 1970s.

History

1970-early 1980s
Jutro was officially formed on 27 December 1970 in Ljubljana. The band was formed by Zoran Crnković (guitar, vocals), Miro Tomassini (bass guitar) and Dragan Gajić (drums). The band had they debut performance only several days after the official formation, on the New Year's Eve concert in Ljubljana's Tivoli Hall. The three forming members were later joined by guiarist Alan Jakin (formerly of the band Era).

Initially Jutro performed boogie rock, but also covered classical pieces. Their version of Mozart's Eine kleine Nachtmusik appeared on the live album Boom Pop Fest '73, recorded on the 1973 BOOM Festival held in Tivoli Hall. The band performed on the 1974 edition of the festival, also held in Tivoli Hall, the recording of their song "Tarantela" ("Tarantella") appearing on the double live album Boom Pop Festival Ljubljana '74. During the 1970s the band held a great number of live concerts and released a 7-inch single with the songs "Prema suncu" ("Towards the Sun") and "Mozart" through PGP-RTB, but failed to gain larger attention of the media.

In 1978 they were joined by saxophonist Lado Jakša, drummer Pavle Ristić and Bulgarian keyboardist Jordan Gančev. The new lineup of Jutro turned towards jazz rock. In 1980 they released their only studio album, entitled Dobro jutro (Good Morning), through ZKP RTLJ. The album featured songs authored by Crnković and a cover of traditional song "Po jezeru" ("On the Lake"). Released at the time of the expansion of the Yugoslav new wave scene, the album was not well by Yugoslav music critics, which described its sound as démodé. After the album release, Jutro spent couple of years performing mostly in Slovenian clubs, before quietly disbanding in the early 1980s..

Post breakup
Pavle Ristić died on 6 December 2006.

Discography

Studio albums
Dobro jutro (1980)

Singles
"Prema suncu" / "Mozzart" (1976)

Other appearances
"Mala nočna glasba" (Boom Pop Fest '73, 1973)
"Tarantela" (Boom Pop Festival Ljubljana '74, 1974)

References

External links
Jutro at Discogs
Jutro at Prog Archives

Slovenian rock music groups
Slovenian jazz-rock groups
Slovenian progressive rock groups
Yugoslav rock music groups
Yugoslav jazz-rock groups
Yugoslav progressive rock groups
Musical groups established in 1970